Michel Nourry (born 11 January 1946) is a former French racing driver. His team finished 18th in the 1998 24 Hours of Le Mans.

References

1946 births
Living people
French racing drivers
24 Hours of Le Mans drivers
Place of birth missing (living people)